John Alexander and John Fitzgerald were the defending champions, but lost in the final this year.

Larry Stefanki and Robert Van't Hof won the title, defeating Alexander and Fitzgerald 6–4, 5–7, 9–7 in the final.

Seeds

Draw

Finals

Top half

Bottom half

External links
 Draw

1984 Grand Prix (tennis)
1984 Bristol Open